The First Women's Bank of California was a local Los Angeles bank dedicated to helping women save money and establish credit. It operated from 1976 until its sale in 1984.
The bank was founded by a group of area businesswomen, which included Virginia Mullan, Laura Liswood, Cappy Fogel, Betty Lessner, Veryl Mortenson, Lee Agajanian, Dianne Freestone (Modisett) Kully, Helene Beck and Julann Griffin.  Griffin is the former wife of producer/entertainer Merv Griffin, and she was instrumental in convincing celebrities to buy stock in the bank and open accounts.  Florence Henderson was the bank's first customer, and eventually Jane Fonda, Loretta Swit, Phyllis Diller, Farrah Fawcett and Anne Bancroft all had accounts there. The bank's mission was expressly feminist.  The bank's board of directors believed that many women did not have enough experience with personal finance or the same access to credit as men.  The bank therefore focused on helping women manage their money, especially after divorce.

Ironically, when the Board first searched for a CEO they were unable to find a qualified woman.  Therefore, Rowan Henry, a man, was hired.  By late 1976, more than $1.5 million in stock had been sold to about 1300 shareholders, 63% of whom were women.

Asked in the Occidental College Alumni magazine what it means to be a bank for women, Board member Dianne Modisett answered, "It means that we eliminate discrimination on the basis of sex.  An individual must still qualify for credit or a loan, but if she doesn't, we want to assist her in becoming qualified… It doesn't make any difference to us whether the woman is single, married, divorced or widowed."
The First Women's Bank struggled to broaden its appeal beyond a small, politically-engaged customer base.  In 1984, it was sold for $2.7 million and reorganized as the Guaranty Bank of California, now GBC International Bank.

References

External links
 https://www.gbcib.com/History.htm
 Anne Crittenden (August 8, 1980) "5 years along and into the black, women's banks see an end", The Miami News, p. 10A.

Defunct banks of the United States
Banks based in California
Feminism in California
Banks established in 1976
1976 establishments in California
Banks disestablished in 1984
1984 disestablishments in California